Carrollton Township, Arkansas may refer to:

 Carrollton Township, Boone County, Arkansas
 Carrollton Township, Carroll County, Arkansas

See also 
 List of townships in Arkansas
 Carrollton Township (disambiguation)

Arkansas township disambiguation pages